Free Congress Foundation may refer to:
 Free Congress Research and Education Foundation, founded by Paul Weyrich, which was a leading conservative voice in US Christian communities for several decades
 American Opportunity, a continuation of the above under new leadership that focuses on economic policies